Corey Baker is a New Zealand classical and contemporary choreographer, film director and former dancer.

Early life 
Baker was born in Christchurch, New Zealand, on 6 June 1990. He attended a rural primary school in Canterbury.

At age fourteen, he was aspiring to be a musical theatre actor in high school. His English teacher, who ran a ballet class in the center of town, saw him tap dancing in the corridor because of his interest and said, “Ballet will help with that.” Baker left high school at fifteen to join the International Ballet Academy (IBA) in Christchurch; he danced full time for a year. His lead teacher at IBA was Carl Myers.

Career  

In 2017, Baker became one of three Resident Choreographers at Royal New Zealand Ballet.
In 2018, Baker created the first professional dance performance in Antarctica, which was filmed for Channel 4 (UK) and aired on Earth Day 2018.

In 2020, Baker received a "Culture in Quarantine" commission from the BBC and remotely directed and choreographed a 3-minute film "Swan Lake Bath Ballet", filmed by 27 elite ballet dancers in their homes during COVID-19 lockdowns. The film was released in July 2020 and went viral, with over 4 million views by the following month. The film won the 2021 Prix Italia award for Web Fiction

In 2021, Baker created two dance films focusing on climate justice: ‘Blown’ for the BBC  and ‘Leaders of a New Regime’,  which uses Lorde’s track of the same title. 'Dance Race', a commission for the BBC's Dance Passion season was broadcast on BBC3 in March 2022.

Baker was chief choreographer and movement director for the opening ceremony of the 2022 Commonwealth Games in Birmingham.

Personal life 

Baker was in a relationship with American actor Jonathan Groff from 2018 to 2020.

References 

People from Christchurch
LGBT choreographers
New Zealand choreographers
New Zealand male ballet dancers
Contemporary dance choreographers
Year of birth missing (living people)
Living people
21st-century New Zealand LGBT people